The 2016–17 EuroLeague Playoffs were played from 18 April to 2 May 2017. A total of 8 teams competed in the Playoffs.

Format

In the playoffs, a best-of-five games format is used. The team that wins the series will be the first team to win three games. The first two games will be played on the playing court of the four highest-place teams, the third game and, if necessary, the fourth, will be played  on the playing court of the next four highest-place teams and the fifth game, if necessary, will be played on the playing court of the four highest-place teams. 

Game 1 was played on 18 and 19 April, game 2 was played on 20 and 21 April, game 3 was played on 25 and 26 April, game 4, if necessary, was played on 28 April, and game 5, if necessary, was played on 2 May 2017.

Qualified teams

Series

|}

Games

Game 1

Game 2

Game 3

Game 4

Game 5

External links
Official website

2016–17 EuroLeague
Euroleague Playoffs